Great Lakes Council was a local government area in the Mid North Coast region of New South Wales, Australia. The area is situated adjacent to the shores of Port Stephens, Myall Lakes and Wallis Lake and the Pacific Highway and the Lakes Way. On 12 May 2016 the council was dissolved and the area included in the Mid-Coast Council, along with the City of Greater Taree and Gloucester Shire.

The Great Lakes area is home to the globally significant, Ramsar Convention listed Myall Lakes wetlands. These wetlands are an important foundation for the economies of the former suburbs of the Great Lakes Council local government area, particularly the recreational fisheries and tourism sectors.

Amalgamation
A 2015 review of local government boundaries by the NSW Government Independent Pricing and Regulatory Tribunal recommended the merger of a number of adjoining councils. In the initial proposal, the Great Lakes Council was not included in any amalgamation proposals. However, Gloucester Shire Council submitted an alternate proposal to amalgamate the Gloucester, Great Lakes and Greater Taree councils. The outcome of an independent review was completed by May 2016, when the council was dissolved.

Towns and localities 

The former Great Lakes Council included the following towns and localities:

 Allworth
 Blueys Beach
 Bombah Point
 Boolambayte
 Boomerang Beach
 Booral
 Booti Booti
 Bulahdelah
 Bundabah
 Bungwahl
 Bunyah
 Carrington
 Charlotte Bay
 Coolongolook
 Coomba Bay
 Coomba Park
 Crawford River
 Darawank
 Elizabeth Beach
 Failford
 Forster
 Girvan
 Green Point
 Hawks Nest
 Limeburners Creek
 Markwell
 Mayers Flat
 Minimbah
 Monkerai
 Mungo Brush
 Myall Lake
 Nerong
 Nooroo
 North Arm Cove
 Pindimar
 Sandbar
 Seal Rocks
 Shallow Bay
 Smiths Lake
 Stroud Road
 Stroud
 Tahlee
 Tarbuck Bay
 Tea Gardens
 Terreel
 The Branch
 Tiona
 Topi Topi
 Tuncurry
 Upper Karuah River
 Upper Myall
 Violet Hill
 Wallingat
 Wallis Lake
 Wards River
 Warranulla
 Washpool
 Weismantels
 Whoota
 Willina
 Wootton
 Yagon

Demographics
Aboriginal and Torres Strait Islander people made up 3.8 per cent of the population, which was higher than the national and state averages of 2.5 per cent. The median age of people in the Great Lakes Council area was 52 years, significantly higher than the national median of 37 years; and the highest median of any local government area in New South Wales. Children aged 0 – 14 years made up 15.4 per cent of the population; and people aged 65 years and over made up 30.6 per cent of the population, with the latter significantly influencing the median age. Of people in the area aged 15 years and over, 52.4 per cent were married and 15.0 per cent were either divorced or separated.

Population growth in the Great Lakes Council between the 2001 census and the 2006 census was 4.00 per cent; and in the subsequent five years to the 2011 census, population growth was 5.08 per cent. When compared with total population growth of Australia for the same periods, being 5.78 per cent and 8.32 per cent respectively, population growth in the Great Lakes Council local government area was significantly lower than the national average. The median weekly income for residents within the Great Lakes Council area was nearly half the national average.

At the 2011 census, the proportion of residents in the Great Lakes Council local government area who stated their ancestry as Australian or Anglo-Saxon exceeded 82 per cent of all residents (national average was 65.2 per cent). In excess of 66% of all residents in the Great Lakes Council area nominated a religious affiliation with Christianity at the 2011 census, which was significantly higher than the national average of 50.2 per cent. Meanwhile, as at the census date, compared to the national average, households in the Great Lakes Council local government area had a significantly lower than average proportion (3.6 per cent) where two or more languages are spoken (national average was 20.4 per cent); and a significantly higher proportion (92.6 per cent) where English only was spoken at home (national average was 76.8 per cent).

Council

Former composition and election method
At the time of its dissolution, the Great Lakes Council was composed of nine councillors elected proportionally as a single ward. All councillors were elected for a fixed four-year term of office. The mayor was elected by the councillors at the first meeting of the council. The most recent and last election was held on 8 September 2012 and the makeup of the council was as follows:

The last Council, elected in 2012 and dissolved in 2016, in order of election, was:

References

External links
 

Former local government areas of New South Wales
2016 disestablishments in Australia